Patteson may refer to:

Surname
John Patteson (1755–1833) (1755–1833), English Tory politician
John Staniforth Patteson, Mayor of Norwich (1823)
Henry Staniforth Patteson, Norwich politician
Henry Tywhitt Stanifoth Patteson, Norwich politician, High Sheriff of Norfolk in 1907
John Patteson (bishop) (1827–1871), Anglican bishop and martyr
Lee Hawse Patteson (1902–1953), the wife of former Governor of West Virginia Okey L. Patteson, and First Lady, 1949–1953
Okey L. Patteson (1898–1989), 23rd Governor of West Virginia for the term following the 1948 election
Roy Kinneer Patteson, Jr. (born 1928), American ancient language scholar

Given name
Patteson Nickalls (stockbroker) (1836–1910), London stockbroker, Liberal politician, president of the Polo and Riding Pony Society
Patteson Oti, politician of the Solomon Islands
Patteson Womersley Nickalls (1877–1946), British polo player who competed in the 1908 Summer Olympics

See also
Patteson Shoal, outer reef in the Reef Islands, in the Solomon Islands province of Temotu
Patteson-Schutte House, historic house located on the south side of the James River in Richmond, Virginia